Hastula albula, the white-banded auger, is a species of sea snail in the family Terebridae.

Description
The size of an adult shell varies between 14 mm and 70 mm.

Distribution
This marine species occurs in the Red Sea, in the Indian Ocean off Aldabra and the Mascarene Basin; off Papua New Guinea and in the Pacific Ocean along Mexico.

References

 Kilburn, R.N. & Rippey, E. (1982) Sea Shells of Southern Africa. Macmillan South Africa, Johannesburg, xi + 249 pp. page(s): 118
 Bratcher T. & Cernohorsky W.O. (1987). Living terebras of the world. A monograph of the recent Terebridae of the world. American Malacologists, Melbourne, Florida & Burlington, Massachusetts. 240pp. 
 Drivas, J. & M. Jay (1988). Coquillages de La Réunion et de l'île Maurice
 Terryn Y. (2007). Terebridae: A Collectors Guide. Conchbooks & NaturalArt. 59pp + plates.
 Severns M. (2011) Shells of the Hawaiian Islands - The Sea Shells. Conchbooks, Hackenheim. 564 pp.
 Castelin M., Puillandre N., Kantor Yu. I., Modica M.V., Terryn Y., Cruaud C., Bouchet P. & Holford M. (2012) Macroevolution of venom apparatus innovations in auger snails (Gastropoda; Conoidea; Terebridae). Molecular Phylogenetics and Evolution 64: 21-44.
 Liu, J.Y. [Ruiyu] (ed.). (2008). Checklist of marine biota of China seas. China Science Press. 1267 pp.

External links
 
 Deshayes G.P. (1859). A general review of the genus Terebra, and a description of new species. Proceedings of the Zoological Society of London. 27: 270-321
 Hinds R.B. (1844 ["1843"). Descriptions of new shells, collected during the voyage of the Sulphur, and in Mr. Cuming's late visit to the Philippines. Proceedings of the Zoological Society of London. 11: 149-159.]
 Fedosov, A. E.; Malcolm, G.; Terryn, Y.; Gorson, J.; Modica, M. V.; Holford, M.; Puillandre, N. (2020). Phylogenetic classification of the family Terebridae (Neogastropoda: Conoidea). Journal of Molluscan Studies. 85(4): 359-388

Terebridae
Gastropods described in 1843